This is a list of public art in Bridgend County Borough in south Wales. This list applies only to works of public art on permanent display in an outdoor public space and does not, for example, include artworks in museums.

Aberkenfig

Blackmill

Bridgend

Caerau

Cefn Cribwr

Kenfig Hill

Pencoed

Pontycymer

Porthcawl

Llangynwyd

Maesteg

References

Bridgend County Borough
Public art